Michael Auprince,  (born 21 February 1993) is an Australian swimmer and wheelchair basketball player.  He set several swimming records and was selected to represent Australia at the 2012 Summer Paralympics in London in swimming, where he won gold and bronze medals. He represented the Rollers team at the 2020 Summer Paralympics.

Personal
Michael Christopher Auprince was born on 21 February 1993, and is from Peakhurst, New South Wales. When he was ten years old, his left leg was amputated by choice; the limb had no muscles as a consequence of a congenital birth defect. Prior to the surgery, he wore a prosthesis that gave his leg support. In 2007, Banks MP Daryl Melham presented Auprince and sixteen other athletes a Federal Government sports achievement award. He attended Peakhurst High School and Georges River College at their Oatley Senior Campus. In 2021, he is undertaking a Master of Information Management at Curtin University and a wheelchair basketball player

Swimming
Auprince is an S9 classified swimmer. He is a member of the Revesby Swimming Club and is coached by Mick Gauci. He took up the sport in 2003 within six months of his leg being amputated.

In 2007, Auprince trained with the Australian Paralympic development team at a training camp in Maroochydore, Queensland. That year, he spent up to twelve hours a week and had broken several age and classification based national swimming records. He first represented Australia in an international competition in 2009 when he competed in the 09 Canadian hosted CanAm Championships. In 2010, he competed in the Sydney hosted State Age Championships, where he set two records including one in the 200 m record in the multi-disability event and the other an Australian record in the 100 m backstroke. That year, he trained up to eleven times a week. He competed at the 2010 IPC World Swimming Championships where he finished fifth in the 100 m backstroke. He was the youngest member of the Australian team competing at the Dutch hosted 2011 IPC World Swimming Championships.

In 2012, Auprince had four gym sessions and nine swimming training sessions a week. He was selected to represent Australia at the 2012 Summer Olympics in swimming. In preparation for the Games, he participated in a sixteen-day Thailand-based team training camp.  While there, he could not fully train as he had to deal with a case of food poisoning. He was scheduled to attend a training camp ahead of the Games in early August in Wales.

At the 2012 Summer Paralympics he won a gold in the  freestyle relay and a bronze in the  medley relay. He also participated in the S9 class of the Men's 100 m Backstroke, 100 m Butterfly, 100 m Freestyle and 50 m Freestyle events – as well as the Men's 200 m Individual Medley SM9. He was awarded an Order of Australia Medal in the 2014 Australia Day Honours "for service to sport as a Gold Medallist at the London 2012 Paralympic Games."

Wheelchair Basketball 
He is classified 4 point player and plays centre.

At the conclusion of the 2012 Paralympic Games, Auprince decided to play wheelchair basketball and was selected for the 2013  Under-23 World Wheelchair Basketball Competition in Turkey, where the team won the bronze medal.

Auprince played in the United States for the Alabama Crimson Tide at the University of Alabama in Tuscaloosa 2015–2019. While playing with the Crimson Tide he won two College National Championships (2018 & 2019). He also played for the Wollongong Rollerhawks in the National Wheelchair Basketball League 2014–2018. in 2019 he switched things up to play with the Perth Wheelcats. In 2018, he was a member of the Rollers that won the bronze medal at 2018 Men's World Wheelchair Basketball Championship in Hamburg, Germany.  Auprince currently plays professionally in Germany with RSV- Lahn Dill.

At the 2020 Tokyo Paralympics, the Rollers finished fifth with a win–loss record of 4–4.

Personal bests

References

External links
Basketball Australia Profile
 

 
 

1993 births
Living people
Australian men's wheelchair basketball players
Wheelchair basketball players at the 2020 Summer Paralympics
Male Paralympic swimmers of Australia
Paralympic gold medalists for Australia
Paralympic bronze medalists for Australia
Paralympic medalists in swimming
Swimmers at the 2012 Summer Paralympics
Medalists at the 2012 Summer Paralympics
Recipients of the Medal of the Order of Australia
S9-classified Paralympic swimmers
Australian male backstroke swimmers
Australian male breaststroke swimmers
Australian male butterfly swimmers
21st-century Australian people